The Platzmann-Sauerland Open is a professional tennis tournament played on clay courts. It is currently part of the ATP Challenger Tour. It is held annually in Lüdenscheid, Germany since 2021.

Past finals

Singles

Doubles

References

ATP Challenger Tour
Clay court tennis tournaments
Tennis tournaments in Germany
Lüdenscheid